James Monroe Christopherson (born February 17, 1938) is an American football player and coach. He played professional football for the Minnesota Vikings in 1962 and was the head coach at Concordia College in Moorhead, Minnesota from 1969 to 2000. He was inducted into the College Football Hall of Fame in July 2007.

He has a wife (Sandra (Sandy) Christopherson) and two children: Reid Christopherson and Heather Teigen. Reid, his wife April, and their four children reside in Colorado Springs, CO.  Heather has a husband, Troy, and three children living with her at home in Lake Park, Minnesota.  

Christopherson coached the Cobbers for 32 seasons, from 1969 to 2000. During that time he amassed a 217–102–7 record. He helped guide the Cobbers to NAIA national championships in 1978 and 1981 and won 11 Minnesota Intercollegiate Athletic Conference (MIAC) titles during his tenure. 

When Christopherson retired in 2000 he was third in wins among active NCAA Division III coaches. He was also fifth in winning percentage among active Division III coaches with more than 15 years of experience and 16th in winning percentage among all active Division III coaches. He was also among an elite group of coaches who have coached for over 30 years at the same school. 

Christopherson, who played for the Minnesota Vikings for two seasons, is the first player or coach from Concordia to receive the college game's highest honor. He became only the second player or coach from the MIAC to be enshrined in the Hall of Fame.

During his tenure at Concordia, Christopherson guided 16 players to All-American honors. He also produced over 120 athletes that were named to the MIAC All-Conference Team, including Barry Bennett, Sr. and Barry Bennett, Jr. 

As a player for the Cobbers, Christopherson was the team captain in 1959 and was named the MIAC Most Valuable Player during that season.

In addition to coaching football, Christopherson also taught sailing at Concordia.

Head coaching record

See also
 List of college football coaches with 200 wins

References

External links
 
 

1938 births
Living people
American football halfbacks
American football linebackers
American football placekickers
American players of Canadian football
Canadian football placekickers
Concordia Cobbers football coaches
Concordia Cobbers football players
Minnesota Vikings players
Toronto Argonauts players
College Football Hall of Fame inductees
People from Otter Tail County, Minnesota
People from Wadena, Minnesota
Coaches of American football from Minnesota
Players of American football from Minnesota